Battalia may refer to:

 Battalia (formation), battle array for both an army and components of an army
 Battalia (moth), a genus of moths belonging to the subfamily Tortricinae of the family Tortricidae

See also
 Battalia (1673), a musical piece composed by Heinrich Ignaz Franz von Biber (see List of musical pieces which use extended techniques and Stylus fantasticus ) 
 La Bataille or La Guerre (1529), a musical piece composed by Janequin to commemorate the Battle of Marignano in 1515 (see Battaglia (music))